Alex Poythress (born September 6, 1993) is an American-Ivorian professional basketball player for Maccabi Tel Aviv of the Israeli Premier Basketball League and the EuroLeague. He won the Gatorade Player of the Year in Tennessee in 2011–12 in his senior year of high school, and was the TSSAA Class AAA Mr. Basketball his senior year. He was a 5-star recruit out of Northeast High School in Clarksville, Tennessee, during 2011–12. He played college basketball for the University of Kentucky.

High school career
Poythress was rated as the number 17 player in the class of 2012 in the ESPNU 100, the number 10 player by Scout.com, and the number 8 player by Rivals.com.

Poythress chose Kentucky over offers from Florida, Tennessee, Memphis, and Vanderbilt, among others.

|}

College career
On December 12, 2014, Poythress was ruled out for the rest of the 2014–15 season after tearing the anterior cruciate ligament in his left knee during practice the previous day.

Poythress returned to Kentucky for his senior season, and averaged 10.2 points and 6.0 rebounds per game. As of the 2020–21 season, Poythress remained one of only five players to play four scholarship seasons under John Calipari at Kentucky.

Professional career

Fort Wayne Mad Ants (2016–2017)
After going undrafted in the 2016 NBA draft, Poythress joined the Orlando Magic for the 2016 NBA Summer League. On August 29, 2016, he signed with the Indiana Pacers. He was waived by the Pacers on October 17, 2016 after appearing in two preseason games. On October 31, 2016, he was acquired by the Fort Wayne Mad Ants of the NBA Development League as an affiliate player of the Pacers.

Philadelphia 76ers (2017)
On April 2, 2017, Poythress signed with the Philadelphia 76ers to help the team deal with numerous injuries. Philadelphia had to use an NBA hardship exemption in order to sign him as he made their roster stand at 16, one over the allowed limited of 15. He made his NBA debut that night, scoring 11 points in 24 minutes off the bench in a 113–105 loss to the Toronto Raptors. On April 11, 2017, he signed with the 76ers for the remainder of the season.

Indiana Pacers (2017–2018)
On August 22, 2017, Poythress signed a two-way contract by the Indiana Pacers. Under the terms of the deal, he will split time between the Pacers and their G-League affiliate, the Fort Wayne Mad Ants, with him projected to return to Fort Wayne once again for the majority of the season. However, on December 28, 2017, Poythress' contract would be converted into a full, regular season contract despite him playing in only 11 games with the Pacers by that point. On July 6, 2018, he was waived by the Pacers.

Atlanta Hawks (2018–2019)
On August 20, 2018, Poythress signed a two-way deal with the Atlanta Hawks. Poythress appeared in 21 games for the Hawks (one start), averaging 5.1 points and 3.6 rebounds per game. He also averaged 23.7 points, 9.7 rebounds, 2.7 assists, 1.1 steals and 1.2 blocks in 18 G-League games for the Erie Bayhawks.

Jilin Northeast Tigers (2019)
On August 12, 2019, Poythress signed with Jilin Northeast Tigers of the CBA.

Galatasaray Doğa Sigorta (2019–2020)
On December 2, 2019, he signed with Galatasaray of the Turkish Basketbol Süper Ligi (BSL). Poythress averaged 12.9 points and 5.4 rebounds per game for the team.

Zenit (2020–2022)
On July 7, 2020, he signed with Zenit Saint Petersburg of the VTB United League and the EuroLeague. On June 16, 2021, Poythress renewed his contract with the Russian club.

Maccabi Tel Aviv (2022–present) 
On June 21, 2022, he signed with Maccabi Tel Aviv of the Israeli Basketball Premier League and EuroLeague.

International career
Poythress received an Ivorian passport in 2022 in order to play for their national team and to not be considered an import player under the Cotonou Agreement.

Career statistics

NBA

Regular season

|-
| style="text-align:left;"| 
| style="text-align:left;"| Philadelphia
| 6 || 1 || 26.2 || .463 || .316 || .800 || 4.8 || .8 || .5 || .3 || 10.7
|-
| style="text-align:left;"| 
| style="text-align:left;"| Indiana
| 25 || 0 || 4.2 || .423 || .364 || – || .7 || .1 || .1 || .0 || 1.0
|-
| style="text-align:left;"| 
| style="text-align:left;"| Atlanta
| 21 || 1 || 14.5 || .494 || .391 || .621 || 3.6 || .8 || .2 || .5 || 5.1
|- class="sortbottom"
| style="text-align:center;" colspan="2"| Career
| 52 || 2 || 10.9 || .472 || .358 || .667 || 2.3 || .5 || .2 || .3 || 3.8

College

|-
| style="text-align:left;"| 2012–13
| style="text-align:left;"| Kentucky
| 33 || 31 || 25.8 || .581 || .424 || .689 || 6.0 || .7 || .3 || .4 || 11.2
|-
| style="text-align:left;"| 2013–14
| style="text-align:left;"| Kentucky
| 40 || 0 || 18.4 || .497 || .242 || .625 || 4.5 || .4 || .3 || .7 || 5.9
|-
| style="text-align:left;"| 2014–15
| style="text-align:left;"| Kentucky
| 8 || 8 || 20.3 || .381 || .000 || .857 || 3.8 || .3 || .5 || 1.5 || 5.5
|-
| style="text-align:left;"| 2015–16
| style="text-align:left;"| Kentucky
| 31 || 23 || 23.6 || .601 || .304 || .706 || 6.0 || .3 || .6 || .7 || 10.2
|- class="sortbottom"
| style="text-align:center;" colspan="2"| Career
| 112 || 62 || 22.1 || .551 || .302 || .686 || 5.3 || .5 || .4 || 0.7 || 8.6

References

External links
Kentucky Wildcats bio

1993 births
Living people
American expatriate basketball people in Russia
American expatriate basketball people in Turkey
American men's basketball players
Atlanta Hawks players
Basketball players from Savannah, Georgia
Basketball players from Tennessee
BC Zenit Saint Petersburg players
Erie BayHawks (2017–2019) players
Fort Wayne Mad Ants players
Galatasaray S.K. (men's basketball) players
Indiana Pacers players
Kentucky Wildcats men's basketball players
Maccabi Tel Aviv B.C. players
McDonald's High School All-Americans
Parade High School All-Americans (boys' basketball)
People from Clarksville, Tennessee
Philadelphia 76ers players
Power forwards (basketball)
Small forwards
Undrafted National Basketball Association players